Conchoeciinae is a subfamily of ostracods in the family Halocypridae.

Genera 
The following genera  are recognised in the subfamily Conchoeciinae:
 

Alacia 
Austrinoecia 
Boroecia 
Clausoecia 
Conchoecetta 
Conchoecia 
Conchoecilla 
Conchoecissa 
Deeveyoecia 
Discoconchoecia 
Gaussicia 
Hyalocoecia 
Juryoecia 
Kyrtoecia 
Lophuroecia 
Loricoecia 
Macrochoecilla 
Macroconchoecia 
Mamilloecia 
Metaconchoecia 
Mikroconchoecia 
Mollicia 
Nasoecia 
Obtusoecia 
Orthoconchoecia 
Paraconchoecia 
Paramollicia 
Parthenoecia 
Parvidentoecia 
Platyconchoecia 
Porroecia 
Proceroecia 
Pseudoconchoecia 
Rotundoecia 
Vityazoecia

References

External links 
 

Arthropod subfamilies
Halocyprida